WTLO (1480 AM) is a commercial adult standards radio station licensed to Somerset, Kentucky, United States. The station is owned by Forcht Broadcasting, a division of the Forcht Group of Kentucky, as part of a duopoly with Science Hill-licensed adult contemporary station WYKY (106.1 FM). In addition to its primary AM signal, WTLO operates a FM translator: W249DF (97.7 FM). WTLO and its translator maintain transmitter facilities, as well as a joint studios with WYKY, along WTLO Road west of Somerset.

History
WTLO was licensed for operations on December 18, 1958. Prior to 2007, the station was owned by three individuals. In that year, the station was sold to its current owner Forcht Group of Kentucky.

Programming
WTLO principally broadcasts an adult standards format with most programming comes from the America's Best Music satellite network. Local programming consists of tradio program Dial-a-Deal, which airs Monday–Saturday 7:30–9 a.m., as well as syndicated old-time radio program When Radio Was during the evening hours Sunday–Friday. WTLO features national news updates from CBS News Radio.  The station additionally airs sports programming from the Cincinnati Bengals and Cincinnati Reds.

External links
WTLO 1480 official website

References

TLO
Adult standards radio stations in the United States
Radio stations established in 1958
Somerset, Kentucky